Nelson Elmer Mathews (born July 21, 1941) is a retired American professional baseball outfielder who appeared in the Major Leagues (MLB) from 1960 to 1965 for the Chicago Cubs and Kansas City Athletics. Born in Columbia, Illinois, he graduated from high school in that community and signed with the Cubs in 1959.

Mathews and made his major league debut with the Cubs on September 9, 1960, against the future world champion Pittsburgh Pirates at Forbes Field. Pinch hitting in the ninth inning for pitcher Mel Wright, he singled off Vinegar Bend Mizell, moved to third base on a double by Richie Ashburn, and came around to score on a single by Don Zimmer. Mathews then spent most of 1961 and 1962 in the minors, where in 1962 he batted .368 and was named an All-Star in the Class B Northwest League. 

In the former year, he started 45 games in center field, and appeared in 61 total games played, but batted only .155. After the season, the Cubs traded him to the Athletics for left-handed pitcher Fred Norman. The A's made him their regular center fielder in 1964. Mathews started 154 games in center and hit 14 home runs, but he led the American League in strikeouts (143) and batted only .239. He began  with Kansas City and got into 67 total games, with 47 outfield starts, but he batted a weak .212 and was sent to Triple-A Vancouver in July. He played through 1967 in the minors before retiring from the game.

In 306 career MLB games played, Mathews collected 218 hits, with 39 doubles, 14 triples and 22 homers. He batted .223 lifetime with 98 runs batted in.

His son T. J. Mathews had an eight-season MLB career (1995–2002) as a relief pitcher.

References

External links

1941 births
Living people
Baseball players from Illinois
Chicago Cubs players
Kansas City Athletics players
Lancaster Red Roses players
Major League Baseball outfielders
Morristown Cubs players
Paris Lakers players
People from Columbia, Illinois
Reading Phillies players
Salt Lake City Bees players
San Antonio Missions players
Syracuse Chiefs players
Vancouver Mounties players
Wenatchee Chiefs players